The Chesapeake Western Railway  is an intrastate railroad in west-central Virginia and it is an operating subsidiary of the Norfolk Southern Railway. 

It extended from Elkton, Virginia on the South Fork of the Shenandoah River in Rockingham County to Stokesville, Virginia in Augusta County at the foot of the Allegheny Mountains.  At Elkton, it interchanged with the Norfolk and Western Railway.  At Harrisonburg, Virginia it interchanged with the Southern Railway.

Construction began in 1895 in Harrisonburg by the Chesapeake and Western Railroad, and proceed both east and west.  To the west, Bridgewater, Virginia was the original terminus, but the line was extended to Stokesville by 1901 by the newly reorganized Chesapeake Western Railway.  In 1933 the line was cut back to Bridgewater, and later to Dayton, Virginia.  To the east the line reached Elkton by 1896, where the line's main yard and shops were constructed.

In 1938 the line was bought by the line's general manager, Don Thomas, with the help of Norfolk and Western, which assumed direct control in 1954.  In 1942, the Baltimore and Ohio's Valley Road of Virginia line, which ran between Harrisonburg and Lexington, Virginia was purchased, though the portion from Staunton, Virginia to Lexington was promptly dismantled.  Later, a portion of the same line to the north of Harrisonburg as far as Mount Jackson, Virginia was added.

The Chesapeake Western Railway operates three rail lines under Norfolk Southern ownership: 

Chesapeake Western (Elkton to Dayton)
Chesapeake Western (Harrisonburg to Pleasant Valley) 
Chesapeake Western (Harrisonburg to Bowman)

At one time, the Chesapeake Western Railway operated its trackage as one rail line called the Chesapeake Western Branch under Norfolk Southern ownership, before it was split into three separate rail lines.

A portion of the line south of Harrisonburg between Pleasant Valley, Rockingham County, Virginia is owned and operated by the Shenandoah Valley Railroad. Furthermore, the old Chesapeake Western Station remains standing in downtown Harrisonburg.

References 

 Detailed history
 Description and photos
 History of several Virginia railroads
 Photos of the abandoned portion past Dayton
 James Madison University Library, (Chesapeake and Western documents)
 James Madison University Library, (Smals diaries)

Virginia railroads
Predecessors of the Norfolk and Western Railway
Railway companies established in 1901